Alberto Macías Hernández (born 28 December 1969) is a Mexican former professional footballer who played as a defender.

A tall center back nicknamed "El Flaco," Macías spent most of his career at Toluca after breaking into the team in 1991. He became a starter in 1992 and, after playing infrequently the next three years, returned to the starting lineup in 1996. Playing alongside teammates such as Salvador Carmona under the guidance of coach Enrique Meza, Macías formed a key part of the defensive line that helped Toluca to league titles in the Verano 1998, Verano 1999, and Verano 2000 seasons. He also provided a strong threat in the air, scoring 11 total goals in the three championship campaigns. In 2000, he moved to Cruz Azul, later playing for Club América, Atlas, Atlante, and San Luis. The Clausura 2004 campaign, with San Luis, was the last for Macías in the Mexican top flight.

Macías was a member of the Mexico national football team competing at the 1992 Summer Olympics in Barcelona, Spain, appearing in all three matches. He also earned four caps for the national A-side, making his debut on November 15, 2000, in a World Cup qualifying match against Canada, substituting Ramón Ramírez in the 76th minute. With former Toluca coach Meza at the helm, Macías got an opportunity with the full national team, but the rise of young Rafael Márquez to join veteran Claudio Suárez in central defense made his task difficult. Macías earned his final cap on February 28, 2001, in a 2–0 loss to the United States to begin the final round of qualifiers for the 2002 FIFA World Cup.

References

External links
 
 
 

1969 births
Living people
Mexico international footballers
Association football defenders
Olympic footballers of Mexico
Footballers at the 1992 Summer Olympics
Atlas F.C. footballers
Cruz Azul footballers
Deportivo Toluca F.C. players
Atlante F.C. footballers
Club América footballers
San Luis F.C. players
Footballers from Guadalajara, Jalisco
Mexican footballers